Christian Parlati (born 23 January 1998) is an Italian judoka. He won one of the bronze medals in the men's 81 kg event at the 2021 European Judo Championships held in Lisbon, Portugal. He also represented Italy at the 2020 Summer Olympics in Tokyo, Japan.

Achievements

References

External links
 
 
 

Living people
1998 births
Sportspeople from Naples
Italian male judoka
Judoka at the 2019 European Games
European Games competitors for Italy
Judoka at the 2020 Summer Olympics
Olympic judoka of Italy
21st-century Italian people